Markku Niinimäki is a Paralympian athlete from Finland competing mainly in category F54 shot put and javelin events.

Markku has competed in two Paralympic Games.  In 2004 he competed in the javelin and won a bronze medal in the F54 shot put.  In 2008 he won a silver in the combined F53/54 shot put and a gold in the F53/54 javelin.

External links
 

Paralympic athletes of Finland
Athletes (track and field) at the 2004 Summer Paralympics
Athletes (track and field) at the 2008 Summer Paralympics
Paralympic gold medalists for Finland
Paralympic silver medalists for Finland
Paralympic bronze medalists for Finland
Living people
Medalists at the 2004 Summer Paralympics
Medalists at the 2008 Summer Paralympics
Year of birth missing (living people)
Place of birth missing (living people)
Paralympic medalists in athletics (track and field)
Finnish male javelin throwers
Finnish male shot putters